{|
|}

The Granville Gee Bee Model Z was an American racing aircraft of the 1930s, the first of the Super Sportster aircraft built by Granville Brothers Aircraft of Springfield, Massachusetts, with the sole intent of winning the Thompson Trophy, which it did in 1931. However, it soon suffered a fatal crash during a world speed record attempt, starting the reputation of the Gee Bee aircraft as killers.

Design and development
Suffering from the effects of the Great Depression, the Granville Brothers decided in July 1931 to build an aircraft to compete in that fall's Thompson Trophy competition at the National Air Races in Cleveland, Ohio.  They hoped that a victory in the prestigious race would lead to additional orders for their line of sporting aircraft.

Constructed in less than five weeks at a cost of under $5,000 USD, the Gee Bee (for "Granville Brothers") Model Z, named City of Springfield, was a small, tubby airplane.  It was essentially the smallest possible airframe constructed around the most powerful available engine of a suitable size, a supercharged Pratt & Whitney Wasp Junior (R-985) 0radial engine, producing .

Operational history
First flying on August 22, 1931, the Gee Bee Z quickly proved to be tricky to fly, but fulfilled every expectation with regards to its speed. On the September 5, the aircraft's engineer, Bob Hall, flew the Gee Bee Z to victory in the General Tire and Rubber Trophy race, then won again the next day in a free-for-all event.

Following the Thompson Trophy race, the Gee Bee Z was re-engined with a larger,  Wasp Senior radial, in preparation for an attempt at establishing a world speed record for landplanes at Wayne County Airport in Detroit, Michigan. A further record attempt on December 5, 1931, would end in tragedy, the aircraft suffering a wing failure and rolling into the ground, killing Bayles.

It was suspected that the Model Z's crash during a speed run in December 1931 was due to an unexpected failure of the gasoline tank cap, which may have come loose and passed through the windshield. A bullet-proof windscreen and internal fuel caps were part of the new design. Analysis of motion picture film of the event examined frame-by-frame, is inconclusive. Control surface flutter is a more likely cause. It is theorized that the gas cap struck the pilot and incapacitated him, causing a sudden upset in pitch that led to uncontrolled flutter in the right aileron which imparted undue stress on that wing, causing it to pitch up sharply and fail. In addition, tests of a reproduction aircraft have shown that the Gee Bee Z was susceptible to aerodynamic flutter at high speed. The 1932 R-1 and its sister ship, the R-2, were the successors of the previous year's Thompson Trophy-winning Model Z.

Legacy
Film of the crash of the Gee Bee Z has become some of the most well known footage from the era of air racing. The crash also helped to establish the reputation of Gee Bee racing aircraft as killers. The Super Sportster design would be refined into the Gee Bee Model R for the 1932 air race season.

Two reproductions of the Gee Bee Z have been constructed. One, a faithful reproduction of the original aircraft, was constructed by Jeff Eicher and Kevin Kimball of Mount Dora, Florida, and is housed in the Fantasy of Flight museum in Lakeland, Florida. The other, constructed by Bill Turner in 1978, features extended wings and fuselage for better flight characteristics. It appeared in 1991 as both a static and flying prop in the Walt Disney feature film The Rocketeer; it is now on display at the Museum of Flight in Tukwila, Washington.

Specifications (Gee Bee Model Z Super Sportster)

Popular culture
Kermit Weeks, founder of Fantasy of Flight, used a Gee Bee Model Z as his main character "Zee" in a series of children's books set around the interwar period.

A modified replica of the Gee Bee Model Z appeared in the 1991 Walt Disney feature film, The Rocketeer.

See also

References

Notes

Bibliography

 Bowers, Pete M. The Gee Bee Racers. Leatherhead, Surrey, UK: Profile Publications Ltd., 1965. 
 Donald, David, ed. The Complete Encyclopedia of World Aircraft. London: Orbis, 1997. .

External links

Granville Brothers aircraft
1930s United States sport aircraft
Single-engined tractor aircraft
Low-wing aircraft
Racing aircraft
Aircraft first flown in 1931